Panellinios IF is a Swedish football club located in Stockholm.

Background
Panellinios Idrottsförening (PIF) is a club with Greek roots, based among Greeks in Sweden, that was formed in late 2002. In their first year, 2003, the team played in Division 6 and subsequently advanced through the divisions reaching Division 2 in 2008. The Panellinios IF youth section has expanded in recent years and for the 2010 season the club had five teams catering for a total of 100 youngsters.

Since their foundation Panellinios IF has participated mainly in the middle and lower divisions of the Swedish football league system.  The club currently plays in Division 3 Östra Svealand which is the fifth tier of Swedish football.  However PIF finished in 12th position and will be relegated back to Division 4 for the 2011 season. They play their home matches at the Vårbergs IP in Stockholm.

Panellinios IF are affiliated to the Stockholms Fotbollförbund.

Season to season

Footnotes

External links
 Panellinios IF – Official website

Football clubs in Stockholm
Greek diaspora in Europe
Association football clubs established in 2002
2002 establishments in Sweden
Greek sports clubs outside Greece
Diaspora football clubs in Sweden